Thomas Walmisley may refer to:

 Thomas Walmsley (judge) (1537–1612), or Walmisley, English judge and politician
 Thomas Attwood Walmisley (1814–1856), English composer and organist